Sangkum Thmei is a district located in Preah Vihear province, in northern Cambodia. According to the 1998 census of Cambodia, it had a population of 13,773.

Administration 
The following table shows the villages of Sangkum Thmei district by commune.

References

Districts of Preah Vihear province